FM 957 can refer to:
 FM 957 (Icelandic Radio Station), an Icelandic Radio Station
 FM 957, a Farm to Market road in Texas